Khun Mae La Noi is a village and tambon (sub-district) of Mae La Noi District, in Mae Hong Son Province, Thailand. In 2005 it had a population of 2,695. The tambon contains five villages.

References

Tambon of Mae Hong Son province
Populated places in Mae Hong Son province